Rockpile is the first solo album by Dave Edmunds, released in 1972. It is principally focused on remakes of late 1950s and early 1960s hits, with a few new songs included. Edmunds plays almost all the instruments except for bass and backing vocals, which are played by John Williams, Edmunds' former bandmate in Love Sculpture. The album included a 1970 British #1 and worldwide Top 10 single, "I Hear You Knocking". A 2001 reissue of the album includes both sides of Edmunds' three pre-album singles as bonus tracks.

Track listing
 "Down Down Down" (Trevor Burton) – 2:52
 "I Hear You Knocking" (Dave Bartholomew, Pearl King) – 2:48
 "Hell of a Pain" (John Williams, Dave Edmunds) – 2:55
 "It Ain't Easy" (Ron Davies) – 3:11
 "Promised Land" (Chuck Berry) – 2:37
 "Dance Dance Dance" (Neil Young) – 2:58
 "(I'm a) Lover Not a Fighter" (Ron Collier) – 3:33
 "Egg or the Hen" (Willie Dixon) – 4:15
 "Sweet Little Rock & Roller" (Chuck Berry) – 2:39
 "Outlaw Blues" (Bob Dylan) – 5:09

Bonus tracks (2001 reissue)
 "I Hear You Knocking" (single mix) (Bartholomew, King) – 2:48
 "Black Bill" (Dave Edmunds) – 3:09
 "I'm Coming Home" (arr. Dave Edmunds) – 3:02
 "Country Roll" (Dave Edmunds) – 3:11
 "Blue Monday" (Dave Bartholomew, Fats Domino) – 2:51
 "I'll Get Along" (John Williams) – 2:50

Charts

Personnel
 Dave Edmunds – vocals, guitars, bass, keyboards, drums
 John Williams – bass, backing vocals
 Andy Fairweather Low – guitar and drums on "Egg or the Hen"
 Terry Williams – drums on "Down Down Down" and "Outlaw Blues"
 B. J. Cole – pedal steel guitar on "Down Down Down", "Dance Dance Dance" and "Outlaw Blues"

Notes

Dave Edmunds albums
1972 debut albums
Regal Zonophone Records albums
MAM Records albums
Repertoire Records albums
Albums produced by Dave Edmunds
Albums recorded at Rockfield Studios